Ascomorpha is a genus of rotifers belonging to the family Gastropodidae.

The genus has almost cosmopolitan distribution.

Species:
 Ascomorpha agilis Zacharias, 1893 
 Ascomorpha dumonti De Smet, 1992 
 Ascomorpha ecaudis Perty, 1850
 Ascomorpha ovalis (Bergendahl, 1892)
Species brought into synonymy
 Ascomorpha ecaudatus Perty, 1850 : synonym of Ascomorpha ecaudis Perty, 1850

References

 O'Reilly, M. (2001). Rotifera, in: Costello, M.J. et al. (Ed.) (2001). European register of marine species: a check-list of the marine species in Europe and a bibliography of guides to their identification. Collection Patrimoines Naturels, 50: pp. 149–151
 Checklist of valid family- and genus-group names in Rotifera - After Segers, H. (2002). Contribution to the nomenclature of Rotifera: Annotated checklist of valid family- and genus-group names. J. Nat. Hist. 36: 631–640. Update 20 Jan. 05

Rotifer genera
Ploima